Dewey Franklin Trigg III (born May 7, 1972) is an American retired mixed martial artist, color commentator, pro wrestler, MMA referee and TV host. Trigg is a veteran of the UFC, Pride Fighting Championships, Rumble on the Rock, Icon Sport-(Icon Sport Middleweight Champion), BAMMA, World Fighting Alliance, and has made professional wrestling appearances in Total Nonstop Action Wrestling.

Mixed martial arts career
In 1995, Trigg began studying judo under Sensei and former Olympian, Patrick Burris. It was while training with Burris that Trigg earned his first black belt and was introduced to the world of Mixed Martial Arts.

A high school state champion wrestler in his native New York, Trigg initially wrestled at Oklahoma State as a walk-on before transferring to Phoenix College. After finishing second in the NJCAA championships, he returned to the NCAA ranks when OSU's arch-rivals Oklahoma offered him a scholarship. After receiving his bachelor's degree in Public Affairs and Administration from OU in 1997, Trigg stayed on as an assistant coach for the Sooners. Frustrated with his place in the US wrestling pecking order, he started a professional MMA career, using his purses to pay for flights to enter international freestyle wrestling tournaments.  In 1999, Trigg fought at Pride 8 in Japan, defeating Fabiano Iha via TKO due to strikes.  Less than a year later, in early 2000, Trigg qualified as an Olympic Trials Finalist in wrestling.

Beating some of the World's best athletes convinced Trigg that a legitimate professional wrestling and mixed martial arts career was the next step.  By the end of 2000, Trigg fought the Shooto world champion Hayato Sakurai for his title. While Trigg initially controlled the bout, Sakurai staged a comeback and brutally knocked Trigg out in the second round due to knees, handing Trigg his first career loss.

Trigg joined the World Fighting Alliance from 2001–2002, where he held the WFA welterweight title.  Trigg was undefeated in WFA.

After several successful years with the WFA, in 2003, Trigg joined the premier organization in the world for MMA, the Ultimate Fighting Championship (UFC). Trigg earned an immediate title shot against champion Matt Hughes at UFC 45: Revolution. After a tactical grappling match-up early on, Trigg fell victim to a rear naked choke in the first round.

Trigg rebounded quickly, defeating Dennis Hallman and Renato Verissimo in UFC 48 and UFC 50 to earn another shot at Hughes' Welterweight Championship.

In their second fight at UFC 52, Trigg had Hughes at the brink of defeat after an illegal groin strike went unnoticed by referee Mario Yamasaki.  Hughes went on to reverse position, and slam Trigg to the mat before locking in a rear naked choke late in round one. This was considered one of the greatest comebacks in UFC history.  After this loss, fans of Frank Trigg affectionately termed the choke the "rear naked Trigg."

Trigg returned at UFC 54 to take on future welterweight champion Georges St-Pierre where he lost by a rear naked choke in the opening round. The loss would be Trigg's final appearance in the UFC until UFC 103, almost 50 events later.

First UFC Release 
After not securing another fight in the UFC, Trigg participated in Rumble on the Rock's 2006 welterweight tournament, winning his first round fight against Ronald Jhun.  He was upset in the second round by Carlos Condit.

Trigg remained inactive after that loss, focusing on his broadcasting job with Pride FC.

He won the Icon Sport Middleweight title on December 6, 2006, TKO-ing Jason "Mayhem" Miller.

His next fight was on at Pride 33, on February 24, 2007, against Middleweight Grand Prix champion Kazuo Misaki. Trigg out wrestled Misaki and maintained control on the ground, winning by a 30–27 unanimous decision.

A month later, on March 31, 2007, Trigg unsuccessfully defended his Icon Sport middleweight title against Robbie Lawler, losing in the fourth round via KO.

On December 17, 2007,  Trigg beat Edwin Dewees in the first round by submission at HDNet Fights- Reckless Abandon.[2] On August 24, 2008, Trigg traveled to Japan to compete at Sengoku 4 where he bested 2000 Judo Olympic Gold Medalist Makoto Takimoto via a unanimous decision. On October 3, 2008, Trigg won a unanimous decision over Falaniko Vitale at Strikeforce: Payback in Denver, Colorado.  On February 14, 2009, Trigg won a unanimous decision over Danny Babcock (5–2) at XCF: Rumble in Racetown in Daytona, FL.

Return to UFC (2009–2010)
On May 27, 2009, Trigg re-signed with the UFC after agreeing a four-fight deal with the company, where he returned to the welterweight division against Ultimate Fighter veteran Josh Koscheck at UFC 103. Koscheck defeated Trigg via first-round TKO.

After this disappointing loss, Trigg went on to face the former UFC welterweight champion Matt Serra at UFC 109 and lost for a second time since his return via KO (punches) in the first round.

Trigg was released by the UFC following his loss to Serra.

Late career
Trigg returned for the inaugural Israel Fighting Championship on November 9. Trigg easily defeated Roy Neeman by strikes in the first round. After the fight, he said he didn't really know what was next for him.

At BAMMA 6, Trigg defeated British standout John Phillips by TKO (doctor stoppage) in round 1.

Trigg was scheduled to be the main event at BAMMA 7 against Tom Watson for the Middleweight title. However, on August 9, it was announced that Watson had to pull out due to a back injury and would be replaced by Jim Wallhead in a non-title fight. Trigg lost the fight via split decision.

On July 11, 2015 Trigg was inducted into the newly restructured UFC Hall of Fame in the fights wing along with Matt Hughes for their second fight at UFC 52.

Total Nonstop Action Wrestling
In addition to MMA, Frank Trigg was also an analyst and on-screen character in Total Nonstop Action Wrestling in 2008, aligning himself with Kurt Angle, who used his passing resemblance to Trigg as part of a storyline.
At No Surrender (2008) he faced A.J. Styles in an MMA style match, the match going to a draw due to an "unintentional" low blow on Trigg. The crowd was hostile to both combatants, chanting "This is bullshit", "We want wrestling", and "Fire Russo". After the match, Styles beat down Trigg using a kendo stick and declared that "I'm a wrestler, I don't do this crap!".

In 2019, Trigg appeared as the trainer for Moose in the build up for his Bound For Glory match with Ken Shamrock. On 20 October 2019, Trigg was in the corner of Moose and interfered several times in the match, most notably removing a turnbuckle pad which Ken Shamrock was thrown into resulting in a Moose victory.

MMA refereeing 
Long a critic of MMA officiating stemming from his second fight with Hughes, Trigg was approached by veteran referee "Big John" McCarthy in 2011 with the offer to take his official's training course. Trigg spent several sessions with McCarthy learning the ins and outs of being an MMA referee and began controlling amateur fights in 2014. On December 9, 2017, Trigg made his UFC debut as a referee, officiating a match-up between Alexis Davis and Liz Carmouche at UFC Fight Night 123.

Personal life
Frank Trigg has four children; Frankie, Kiara, Stone, and Lavin. Trigg welcomed his son Stone in September 2008. On October 2, 2010, Trigg welcomed his son Lavin.

In 2006, he appeared in the episode "Fight Schlub" on the sitcom The King of Queens. He has mostly worked as a stuntman since retirement from fighting, with credits including extensive work on the re-make of Hawaii Five-0. Frank is also a member of Phi Beta Sigma fraternity, initiated in 1997 at the Xi Delta chapter at the University of Oklahoma

He is the second retired UFC fighter to return as a UFC referee, with the first being Dan Severn.

Championships and accomplishments
Ultimate Fighting Championship
 UFC Hall of Fame (Fight wing) vs. Matt Hughes at UFC 52
World Fighting Alliance
WFA Welterweight Championship (One time)
Icon Sport
Icon Sport Middleweight Championship (One time)

Mixed martial arts record

|-
| Loss
| align=center| 21–9
| Jim Wallhead
| Decision (split)
| BAMMA 7: Trigg vs. Wallhead
| 
| align=center| 3
| align=center| 5:00
| Birmingham, England
| 
|-
| Win
| align=center| 21–8
| John Phillips
| TKO (punches)
| BAMMA 6: Watson vs. Rua
| 
| align=center| 1
| align=center| 2:41
| London, England
| 
|-
| Win
| align=center| 20–8
| Roy Neeman
| TKO (punches)
| Israel FC: Genesis
| 
| align=center| 1
| align=center| 2:36
| Tel Aviv, Israel
| 
|-
| Loss
| align=center| 19–8
| Matt Serra
| TKO (punches)
| UFC 109
| 
| align=center| 1
| align=center| 2:23
| Las Vegas, Nevada, United States
| 
|-
| Loss
| align=center| 19–7
| Josh Koscheck
| TKO (punches)
| UFC 103
| 
| align=center| 1
| align=center| 1:25
| Dallas, Texas, United States
| 
|-
| Win
| align=center| 19–6
| Danny Babcock
| Decision (unanimous)
| XCF: Rumble in Racetown 1
| 
| align=center| 3
| align=center| 5:00
| Daytona, Florida, United States
| 
|-
| Win
| align=center| 18–6
| Falaniko Vitale
| Decision (unanimous)
| Strikeforce: Payback
| 
| align=center| 3
| align=center| 5:00
| Broomfield, Colorado, United States
| 
|-
| Win
| align=center| 17–6
| Makoto Takimoto
| Decision (unanimous)
| World Victory Road Presents: Sengoku 4
| 
| align=center| 3
| align=center| 5:00
| Saitama, Saitama, Japan
| 
|-
| Win
| align=center| 16–6
| Edwin Dewees
| Submission (kimura)
| HDNet Fights: Reckless Abandon
| 
| align=center| 1
| align=center| 1:40
| Dallas, Texas, United States
| 
|-
| Loss
| align=center| 15–6
| Robbie Lawler
| KO (punches)
| Icon Sport: Epic
| 
| align=center| 4
| align=center| 1:40
| Honolulu, Hawaii, United States
| 
|-
| Win
| align=center| 15–5
| Kazuo Misaki
| Decision (unanimous)
| Pride 33
| 
| align=center| 3
| align=center| 5:00
| Las Vegas, Nevada, United States
| 
|-
| Win
| align=center| 14–5
| Jason Miller
| TKO (soccer kicks)
| Icon Sport - Mayhem vs. Trigg
| 
| align=center| 2
| align=center| 2:53
| Honolulu, Hawaii, United States
| 
|-
| Loss
| align=center| 13–5
| Carlos Condit
| Submission (triangle armbar)
| Rumble on the Rock 9
| 
| align=center| 1
| align=center| 1:22
| Honolulu, Hawaii, United States
| 
|-
| Win
| align=center| 13–4
| Ronald Jhun
| Decision (unanimous)
| Rumble on the Rock 8
| 
| align=center| 3
| align=center| 5:00
| Honolulu, Hawaii, United States
| 
|-
| Loss
| align=center| 12–4
| Georges St-Pierre
| Submission (rear-naked choke)
| UFC 54
| 
| align=center| 1
| align=center| 4:09
| Las Vegas, Nevada, United States
| 
|-
| Loss
| align=center| 12–3
| Matt Hughes
| Submission (rear-naked choke)
| UFC 52
| 
| align=center| 1
| align=center| 4:05
| Las Vegas, Nevada, United States
| 
|-
| Win
| align=center| 12–2
| Renato Verissimo
| TKO (elbows)
| UFC 50
| 
| align=center| 2
| align=center| 2:11
| Atlantic City, New Jersey, United States
| 
|-
| Win
| align=center| 11–2
| Dennis Hallman
| TKO (punches)
| UFC 48
| 
| align=center| 1
| align=center| 4:15
| Las Vegas, Nevada, United States
| 
|-
| Loss
| align=center| 10–2
| Matt Hughes
| Submission (standing rear-naked choke)
| UFC 45
| 
| align=center| 1
| align=center| 3:54
| Uncasville, Connecticut, United States
| 
|-
| Win
| align=center| 10–1
| Dennis Hallman
| TKO (punches)
| WFA 3: Level 3
| 
| align=center| 1
| align=center| 3:50
| Las Vegas, Nevada, United States
| 
|-
| Win
| align=center| 9–1
| Jason Medina
| TKO (submission to elbows)
| WFA 2: Level 2
| 
| align=center| 1
| align=center| 3:43
| Las Vegas, Nevada, United States
| 
|-
| Win
| align=center| 8–1
| Laverne Clark
| TKO (submission to punches and elbows)
| World Fighting Alliance 1
| 
| align=center| 3
| align=center| 2:15
| Las Vegas, Nevada, United States
| 
|-
| Loss
| align=center| 7–1
| Hayato Sakurai
| TKO (knees)
| Shooto: R.E.A.D. Final
| 
| align=center| 2
| align=center| 2:25
| Chiba, Chiba, Japan
| 
|-
| Win
| align=center| 7–0
| Ray Cooper
| Submission (forearm choke)
| WEF: New Blood Conflict
| 
| align=center| 2
| align=center| 3:05
| N/A
| 
|-
| Win
| align=center| 6–0
| Fabiano Iha
| TKO (punches)
| Pride 8
| 
| align=center| 1
| align=center| 5:00
| Tokyo, Japan
| 
|-
| Win
| align=center| 5–0
| Jean Jacques Machado
| TKO (corner stoppage)
| Vale Tudo Japan 1998
| 
| align=center| 3
| align=center| 0:20
| Tokyo, Japan
| 
|-
| Win
| align=center| 4–0
| Marcelo Aguiar
| TKO (punches)
| Shooto - Las Grandes Viajes 3
| 
| align=center| 2
| align=center| 3:08
| Tokyo, Japan
| 
|-
| Win
| align=center| 3–0
| Dan Gilbert
| Submission (forearm choke)
| Unified Shoot Wrestling Federation 7
| 
| align=center| 1
| align=center| 2:45
| Texas, United States
| 
|-
| Win
| align=center| 2–0
| Javier Buentello
| Submission (rear-naked choke)
| Unified Shoot Wrestling Federation 7
| 
| align=center| 1
| align=center| 2:35
| Texas, United States
| 
|-
| Win
| align=center| 1–0
| Ali Elias
| KO (knee)
| Unified Shoot Wrestling Federation 7
| 
| align=center| 1
| align=center| 10:36
| Texas, United States
|

ADCC Submission Grappling Record

See also
List of male mixed martial artists
List of Phi Beta Sigma brothers

References

External links
 Official site of Frank Trigg
 
 

1972 births
Sportspeople from Rochester, New York
Living people
American male mixed martial artists
Welterweight mixed martial artists
Middleweight mixed martial artists
Mixed martial artists from New York (state)
Mixed martial artists utilizing collegiate wrestling
Mixed martial artists utilizing catch wrestling
Mixed martial artists utilizing judo
Mixed martial artists utilizing Brazilian jiu-jitsu
American practitioners of Brazilian jiu-jitsu
American male judoka
American male sport wrestlers
American male professional wrestlers
Mixed martial arts broadcasters
Mixed martial arts referees
Participants in American reality television series
African-American mixed martial artists
African-American male professional wrestlers
American professional wrestlers of Italian descent
Ultimate Fighting Championship male fighters
21st-century African-American sportspeople
20th-century African-American sportspeople